The Battle of Yehuling, literally the Battle of Wild Fox Ridge, was a major decisive battle fought between the Mongol Empire and Jurchen-led Jin dynasty during the first stage of the Mongol conquest of the Jin dynasty. The battle was fought between August and October 1211 at Yehuling (野狐嶺; lit. "Wild Fox Ridge"), which is located northwest of present-day Wanquan District, Zhangjiakou, Hebei Province. The battle concluded with a total Mongol victory that allowed them to overrun and conquer the northern part of the Jin. It also hastened the weakening and decline of the Jin dynasty.

Background 
In 1206, Temüjin had united all the tribes in Mongolia under his rule and received the title "Genghis Khan". The Jurchen-led Jin dynasty in northern China became a major obstacle to the Mongol Empire's quest for world domination. In the past, the Jin dynasty had adopted a divide-and-rule strategy to break up the various Mongol tribes and keep them under control. However, after realising that this strategy no longer worked, they began to actively prepare for war with the aim of eliminating the Mongol threat in a single campaign. Starting in the reign of Emperor Zhangzong, the Jin dynasty had constructed a line of structural defences about 300 kilometres long along its northern border; this line is sometimes loosely referred to as the "Jin dynasty's Great Wall".

Earlier in 1204, Genghis Khan had subdued the Ongud, a Mongol tribe helping the Jin dynasty guard its northern border. At the same time, Genghis Khan also formed an alliance with the Ongud by marrying his daughter to the Ongud chief's son. The Mongols controlled the area north of the Yin Mountains and started stockpiling resources in preparation for a military campaign against the Jin dynasty. Moreover, the Mongols had also been actively luring and inducing some Jurchens to defect or surrender. The Jin emperor Xingsheng underestimated the Mongol threat and had been gradually neglecting the defences against the Mongols. He was also delusional in his belief that the Jin dynasty was far more powerful than the Mongols.

In 1210, Genghis Khan insulted Emperor Xingsheng of the Jin by publicly stating that he was cowardly and unfit to be a leader. He also added, "The emperor should be a man from the sky like me." When the Jin emperor received news of this, he was so enraged that he executed the Mongol ambassador. Tensions between the Mongols and Jin dynasty started to escalate. In March 1211, the Mongols rallied 100,000 troops for a campaign against the Jin dynasty, leaving behind only about 2,000 men to guard their base in Mongolia. This meant that well over 90% of the Mongol forces had been mobilized for the campaign. Before embarking, Genghis Khan prayed to the sky deity Tengri along the Kherlen River to bless the Mongols with victory, and made a symbolic vow to avenge his ancestor, Ambaghai, who was executed by crucifixion in 1146 at the order of Emperor Xizong of the Jin dynasty.

Prelude 
The Mongol horse army led by Genghis Khan, with their preparations for war now complete, sped out towards the Great Wall by late March 1211, which was the border between the Mongol Empire and Jin China, finally beginning the Mongol war of conquest against the Jin. The Great Wall, backed up with numerous castles and towers, was defended by nearly a million Jin imperial soldiers which was composed of 800,000 infantry and 150,000 elite cavalry whom Emperor Xingsheng earlier sent as a defensive measure to counter the Mongol threat. The Jin general Wanyan Chenyu, sent by the Jin emperor under direct orders to stop and if possible crush the Mongol incursion, was the one leading the Jin army in the Great Wall. 

Although the Jin imperial army outnumbered the invading Mongol forces nearly ten times its own, Wanyan Chenyu ordered them to be spread out throughout the Wall in an attempt to block the Mongol approach, meaning in any one place several sections and ramparts of the wall have only a few defenders on them. The Wall itself is not a continuous defensive wall but a system of fortifications with many walls not connected towards each other but are supported and reinforced by castles and fortresses. This is a fact that Genghis Khan recognized, having his scouts keep watch on much of the Wall before he could engage his forces. Having gained intelligence from his scouts, he thus recognized that the least defended portion of the Wall's defensive system was at the Wusha Fortress, which leads to a desert ridge called Yehuling, inhabited by wild foxes hence the name of the area which in Chinese literally means the "Wild Fox Ridge". The ridge of Yehuling is northwest of the Juyong Pass, which was the gateway towards the Jin capital of Zhongdu (中都, lit. "central capital"; present-day Beijing); it was also at the plain at the foot of the ridge that the main force of the Jin army, numbering 400,000 troops, was also encamped.

Campaign 
The battle was fought in three stages between March and October 1211, as soon as the Mongol army went past through the Great Wall with little opposition.

Battle of Wusha Fortress
The Jin chancellor, Duji Sizhong (獨吉思忠), led the bulk of the Jin army to the northwestern frontline. The Jin could not match the numbers of Mongol horsemen, and had only 30,000–50,000 troops. The chancellor sent troops to reinforce the defenses along the Jin dynasty's Great Wall and prevent the Mongols from advancing further south. Genghis Khan ordered his third son, Ögedei to lead a separate force to attack the Jin western capital, Xijing (西京; present-day Datong, Shanxi), and block enemy reinforcements. The Khan himself led the main Mongol army to attack Wusha Fortress (烏沙堡) and capture Wuyue Camp (烏月營), thus destroying the Jin army's defence lines. Duji Sizhong was killed in action and most of the Jin army was wiped out. This battle took place between March and the end of June 1211. The Mongols then rested for about a month before moving towards Yehuling and sending an ambassador to meet the Jin imperial court.

Battle of Yehuling and Huan'erzui
Wanyan Chengyu (完顏承裕), who succeeded Duji Sizhong as chancellor, was put in charge of the Jin army. He ordered his men to abandon the three cities of Hengzhou (恆州; in present-day Zhenglan Banner, Inner Mongolia, Changzhou (昌州; north of present-day Jiuliancheng Town, Guyuan County, Hebei), Fuzhou (撫州; present-day Zhangbei County, Hebei), and move towards Yehuling. His aim was to make use of the mountainous terrain in Yehuling to obstruct the Mongol cavalry.

Mountainous terrain was a challenge for the Mongolian cavalry.  However it was also a difficult area to fight in for the bigger Jin forces. The vast Jin forces were scattered among the mountains and the valley choke points.  The difficult terrain and far distances made communication and coordination of troops difficult.  This would prove fatal for the Jin forces, when the Mongols executed a focused and concentrated attack.  

The Jin imperial court sent Shimo Ming'an (石抹明安), an official of Khitan descent, to meet Genghis Khan and start peace negotiations. However, Genghis Khan managed to induce Shimo Ming'an to surrender and defect to his side. Shimo Ming'an even provided the Mongols with military intelligence about the Jin army.

Genghis Khan sent his general Muqali to lead the Balu Unit (八魯營) to launch a surprise cavalry charge on the enemy via a passage at Huan'erzui (獾兒嘴; lit. "Badger Mouth"). Before the battle, Muqali promised Genghis Khan, "I will not return alive if I do not defeat the Jin army!" The Mongol army's morale surged. Because of the mountainous terrain, the Mongols were unable to deploy their superior cavalry to its full advantage, hence they dismounted and fought on foot. High on morale, the Mongols defeated the central Jin forces and fought their way towards Wanyan Chengyu's main camp. Due to poor communications, the Jin forces on the sides were not able to reinforce the central Jin positions. 
 
Eventually, the Jin army became disorganized, lost its morale, and started to break. The Jin army's field commander, Wanyan Jiujin (完顏九斤), was killed in action. With the collapse of the central Jin forces, the other Jin forces nearby soon routed and a massacre followed.  The entire Jin army was destroyed, leaving dead corpses for over a hundred miles. This battle took place in August 1211.

Battle of Huihe Fortress
Wanyan Chengyu managed to rally the scattered Jin forces after the Battle of Huan'erzui and Yehuling and gather at Huihe Fortress (澮河堡). However, they soon came under attack by pursuing Mongol forces around October 1211. The Mongols swiftly surrounded the Jin forces and engaged them in fierce battle for three days. Genghis Khan then personally led 3,000 horsemen on a cavalry charge towards the enemy while the remaining Mongol forces followed behind. The entire Jin army was destroyed while Wanyan Chengyu barely escaped alive. Wanyan Chengyu was replaced by Tushan Yi (徒單鎰) as chancellor.

Aftermath
After the battle, Emperor Xingsheng of the Jin was assassinated in the central capital, Zhongdu (中都; present-day Beijing), by one of his generals, Hushahu (胡沙虎), who then took control of the city. The Mongols pressed on and besieged Zhongdu for about four years. During the siege, the residents of Zhongdu were forced to resort to cannibalism to survive, before they finally decided to surrender. The Mongols allowed the Jin dynasty to retain control of Zhongdu but forced them to pay a tribute of 500 men, 500 women, and 3,000 horses. In the summer of 1212, Emperor Xuanzong of the Jin dynasty abandoned Zhongdu and relocated the capital to Bianjing (present-day Kaifeng, Henan) in the south.  This display of weakness and fear only encouraged the Mongols to continue their attack to conquer the rest of Jin.  

The forces of the Jin dynasty were defeated in detail in the Yehuling Campaign. Roughly ten Jin cities were plundered by the Mongols. While the Jin dynasty managed to retain power for the next two decades or so, its core was severely weakened. In spite of the defeat, the Jin dynasty prioritised conquering the Southern Song dynasty in southern China over defending its borders against future Mongol incursions and invasions. This led to increasing enmity between the Southern Song dynasty and the Jin dynasty. Eventually, the Southern Song dynasty allied with the Mongols against the Jin dynasty and destroyed the latter in 1234.

See also
 Tumu Crisis
 Battle of Mohi
 Battle of Legnica

References

Mongol conquest of Jin China
Battles involving the Mongol Empire
Conflicts in 1211
1211 in the Mongol Empire
History of Zhangjiakou